Stadio Sandro Cabassi, is a multi-purpose stadium in Carpi, Italy. It is mainly used mostly for football matches and hosts the home matches of Carpi F.C. 1909. The stadium has a capacity of 5,510 spectators.

History
The Stadio Sandro Cabassi opened in 1928 and has played host to Carpi F.C. 1909. After Carpi's Serie A promotion for the 2015–16 season, they played in Modena F.C.'s Stadio Alberto Braglia in order to follow minimum capacity rules in Serie A. Following their relegation after the season concluded, they moved back.

In the 2013-14 season, Stadio Sandro Cabassi hosted Serie B football for the first time. The first Serie B match saw Carpi lose 0-2 to Empoli F.C. with an attendance of 2,363.

Stands

References

External links
Stadio Sandro Cabassi at Carpi F.C. 1909 website
Stadium Journey Article

Football venues in Italy
Buildings and structures in Carpi, Emilia-Romagna
A.C. Carpi
Multi-purpose stadiums in Italy